Collagenase IV may refer to one of two enzymes:
Gelatinase A
Gelatinase B